Alastair Aiken (born 6 November 1993), better known by his online alias Ali-A (or by his original alias Matroix), is a British YouTuber known for Call of Duty and Fortnite commentaries and vlogs. He is one of the highest-paid professional online gamers. His main channel Ali-A has a subscriber count of over 18 million, with its total views exceeding 5 billion. His second channel, More Ali-A, has a YouTube subscriber count of over 7.7 million and a total of over 1.9 billion video views. On 23 April 2018, Ali-A created a new channel, titled "Clare & Ali" with his partner, Clare Siobhan. The channel has since gained over 777,000 subscribers and generated more than 29 million video views. In September 2020, he created a fourth channel titled "Ali-A Plays", where he uploads content relating to the Call of Duty franchise only. Currently, the channel has more than 386,000 subscribers and more than 21.2 million video views.

Aiken often refers to his YouTube subscriber fanbase as the "Ali-A Army". In July 2015, he was awarded the Guinness World Records for 'Most Popular Call of Duty Channel by views' and 'Most Popular Call of Duty Channel by subscribers'. Aiken frequently attends the Electronic Entertainment Expo (E3) as well as other video game conventions. In 2013, Aiken wrote a guest blog post in Huffington Post UK. The Huffington Post has also stated that "Ali is one of the UK's most popular and influential entities globally and is at the forefront of the online and YouTube revolution." In September 2015, Aiken, along with Tom Cassell and Daniel Middleton, starred in Legends of Gaming Live, with the trio being referred to as "[s]ome of the most popular YouTubers in the [United Kingdom]". Redbull's eSports division has referred to his main YouTube channel as the "biggest Call of Duty YouTube channel." In March 2016, Clickible.com listed Aiken as the seventeenth "Most Famous Youtuber [sic]... on Earth". Later that year, Business Insider listed him as the ninth most popular British YouTube star – the same ranking they gave him in 2015. On 6 June 2017, the BBC referred to Aiken as a "YouTube megastar".

YouTube career

Channel format 
The main focus of Aiken's videos on his main channel is his commentaries and live reactions to video games as he plays them. The video games that he usually plays on the channel are within the Call of Duty franchise, and Fortnite but that is not always the case. On his second channel, More Ali-A, his content is typically around more family-friendly games such as Minecraft and vlogs about his day-to-day life and travels. He does not consistently have the same introductions to his videos; however, he does usually start them off talking to the camera in a vlog-like fashion before moving into gameplay.

When new installments to the Call of Duty video game franchise are announced, Aiken covers known information about the games, giving viewers in-depth reviews. Once the games are released, he creates video game walkthrough series on the games, demonstrating to viewers how to complete the new Call of Duty game.

Public image and influence

Relationship with YouTube networks 
Aiken signed with the YouTube multi-channel network (MCN), Polaris, in October 2013. Currently he is signed on with the MCN StyleHaul on both his Ali-A and More Ali-A channels. Other notable YouTubers within the network include both of Daniel Middleton's YouTube channels and KSI. According to Socialblade's statistics, both of Aiken's YouTube channels are within the top 50 in the network.

Supporting programs 
During 2016, Aiken teamed up with other large YouTube content creators within the United Kingdom teamed up with Mattessons as part of a campaign to teach young people basic programming skills. The campaign resulted in over 13 million views on YouTube and lead to over 24,000 youth learning basic programming skills in the programming language Python.

Aiken co-hosted NCS Yes Live 2016 on 29 March in the London Roundhouse. The event celebrates the "impact young people's social change projects have had on local communities."

Affiliations, partnerships, and sponsors 
Aiken's sponsors include:
Kontrol Freek
Monster
Elgato Gaming
G2A
Scuf Gaming 

Scuf Gaming has released a themed controller, based around the Ali-A Game On for PlayStation, Xbox, and PC.

Appearances in other media 
Aiken has made appearances on the television show The Gadget Show and was a guest speaker for them in 2013 and 2014. He was interviewed by the British Broadcasting Corporation (BBC) on 10 May 2013. Alongside KSI, Aiken discussed the new paid subscriptions that were coming to YouTube (YouTube Red) at the time. Aiken was featured alongside KSI and other popular YouTubers in Britain in a BBC Radio 1 documentary in 2014 called Rockstar Gamers. In 2015 BBC Newsbeat uploaded a YouTube video of an interview with Aiken. Within the video, he gave tips to improve player's skills within First Person Shooter video games. Aiken has also been featured in the Mobile video game, Celebrity Street Fight, in 2015 alongside DanTDM, KSI, Marcus Butler, and Deji Olatunji (ComedyShortsGamer).

In October 2015, Ali-A was listed by Business Insider as the ninth most popular British YouTube star.

In January 2016 Aiken was subject of the documentary Minecraft: Into The Nether alongside other popular YouTube personalities such as KSI and Syndicate. The focus of the documentary was charting the "Minecraft phenomenon" through the quartet's meteoric rise to online fame. In September of that year, wwd.com referred to Aiken's audience size and following as a following that "most advertisers would drool over." In both 2015 and 2016, Business Insider has listed Aiken as the ninth most popular British YouTuber.

On 7 April 2017, Aiken was mentioned in an article by Business Insider France. On 30 June 2017, it was announced as part of a joint statement by Sassy Films, CBBC and BBC Worldwide that Aiken will host a television show titled "Ali-A's Superchargers (10×20′)". The show "puts children in charge" of redecorating their family car, "without their parents' input." The BBC has called Aiken a "YouTube megastar". Virgin Media published a brief online article in July 2017 about Aiken's hands-on experience with the Destiny 2 Beta. In October 2017, Ali-A Adventures: Game On!, a graphic novel was released. Aiken has also hosted a show called "I'm Not Driving That".

Charity work 
In August 2016, Aiken took part in Cancer Research UK's 1,000 hours of fundraising event according to cancerresearchuk.org.

Awards and nominations

Publications

Notes

References

Further reading 
 Forbes: 6 Insider Tips That Make YouTube Work For Kids
 Eurostar leverages Pokemon Go and YouTube influencer Ali-A to promote affordable Snap fare
 New Documentary Features Some of Minecraft's Biggest Stars
  1,000 hours of fundraising for Stand Up To Cancer
 Hitman: here's what being Agent 47's handler looks like in real-life

External links 
 Ali-A on YouTube (main YouTube channel)
 MoreAli-A on YouTube (second YouTube channel)

1993 births
English YouTubers
Gaming YouTubers
Gaming-related YouTube channels
Let's Players
Living people
Video bloggers
Video game commentators
Vlogs-related YouTube channels
YouTube channels launched in 2006

YouTube vloggers